Play Dead is a 2022 American horror thriller film directed by Patrick Lussier and written by Simon Boyes and Adam Mason. The film stars Bailee Madison and Jerry O'Connell. The plot follows Criminology student Chloe who fakes her own death to break into a morgue, in order to retrieve a piece of evidence that ties her younger brother to a crime gone wrong.

Cast
 Bailee Madison as Chloe
 Jerry O'Connell as Coroner
 Anthony Turpel as T.J.
 Chris Lee as Ross 
 Chris Butler as Sheriff Dugan
 Jorge Luis-Pallo as Mannix
 Kyler O'Neal as Randy

Production
In May 2022, it was announced Voltage Pictures would be pre-selling the film to buyers at the Cannes Film Festival.

Reception

Critical response
Phil Hoad of The Guardian gave the film three out of five stars, praising the performances of Madison and particularly O'Connell's, stating that "Play Dead benefits most from O’Connell’s astute turn as the sharpest tailored killer since Patrick Bateman going about his business with a grim sang-froid and scarily controlled violence at the slab. It’s a terrible advert for organ donation but a compact and resourceful thriller.''

References

External links
 
 

2022 films
2022 horror films
2020s American films
2020s English-language films
2020s thriller films
American thriller films